The 215th Infantry Division (German: 215. Infanterie-Division) was a unit in the German Imperial Army during World War I. Created in September 1916, it primarily saw service on the Eastern Front and in Ukraine.

Order of battle (May 1918)
61. Reserve-Infanterie-Brigade
Reserve-Ersatz-Regiment Nr. 2
Landwehr-Infanterie-Regiment Nr. 71
Reserve-Infanterie-Regiment Nr. 224
3. Eskadron/Reserve-Husaren-Regiment Nr. 8
Artillerie-Kommandeur Nr. 215
Feldartillerie-Regiment Nr. 274
Division-Nachrichtung-Kommandeur Nr. 215

Chronology
1916
15 September – 17 September – In reserve behind Armee-Abteilung A in France
18 September – 2 November – Frontline service in Champagne
2–8 November – Transported to the Eastern Front
8 November – 31 December – Frontline service on Upper Styr and Stochod rivers

1917
1 January – 1 December – Frontline service on Upper Styr and Stochod rivers
2 December – 17 December – Ceasefire on Eastern Front
18 December – 31 December – Armistice on Eastern Front

1918
1 January – 18 February – Armistice on Eastern Front
18 February – 21 June – Service in Ukraine
22 June – 5 November – Occupation of Ukraine
16 November – 31 December – Withdrawal from Ukraine

1919
1 January – 16 March – Withdrawal from Ukraine

Sources

215. Infanterie-Division (Chronik 1916/1918)

Infantry divisions of Germany in World War I
Military units and formations established in 1916
1916 establishments in Germany
Military units and formations disestablished in 1919